Blåhø or Blåhøe is a mountain in Innlandet county in Norway. The European route E6 highway runs past the east side of the mountain.

Media gallery

See also
List of mountains of Norway

References

External links
 Gonorway - Vaga

Dovre
Vågå
Mountains of Innlandet